Cúllar Vega is a town in Andalusia, Spain. Situated in the central part of the Vega of Granada, in the province of Granada, it borders the municipalities of  Vegas del Genil, Churriana de la Vega and Las Gabias.

Demography
According to the National Institute of Statistics of Spain, Cúllar Vega had 7139 registered inhabitants in 2014.

Governance
The municipality was governed from 2003 by the socialist Juan de Dios Moreno. After more than a decade in charge, he resigned in May 2014, being replaced by his party colleague Jorge Sánchez Cabrera.

Location

References

Municipalities in the Province of Granada